Savitar is a fictional supervillain appearing in comic books published by DC Comics. An immensely powerful speedster that leads a cult dedicated to the Speed Force, he has battled Wally West, Jay Garrick, and Barry Allen.

A variation of the character appeared in the third season of The CW's live-action television series The Flash, voiced by Tobin Bell.

Publication history
Savitar first appeared in Flash (vol. 2) #108 (December 1995), and was created by Mark Waid and Oscar Jimenez.

Fictional character biography
Savitar was originally an unnamed pilot for a third-world nation that was to test a supersonic fighter jet during the Cold War. As he reached top speed, his plane was struck by what appeared to be lightning and he went down in hostile territory. Discovering he could defeat the enemy by moving at super-speed, he became obsessed, naming himself after the Hindu "god of motion" Savitar and dedicating his life to unlocking its secrets. As he studied, Savitar discovered new powers that no other living speedster has mastered. He can protect himself in a null-inertia force field, give speed and kinetic energy to objects or people, even those in a "rest state", and he could also heal his own injuries almost instantly.

Savitar's obsession gained followers, and he became the leader of a cult. In search of more knowledge, he sought out the only super-speed hero operating at the time: Johnny Quick. This encounter became a battle, the tide of which was turned with Max Mercury's arrival leading Savitar toward the Speed Force, but causing him to bounce off, both speedsters being thrown forward in time. Emerging from the timestream before Savitar, Max Mercury became a mentor to the Flash family's various members and other speedsters, secretly preparing them against the day Savitar would exit the timestream.

Reappearing decades later, Savitar found that his cult had grown in his absence, awaiting his return. He recruited former Blue Trinity member Lady Flash (Christina Alexandrova), and discovered a way to use the woman's speed to divert all energy from the Speed Force to his own army of ninjas. He then sought to eliminate the competition: The Flash (Wally West), Impulse, Golden Age Flash (Jay Garrick), Johnny Quick, Jesse Quick, XS and Max Mercury.

Wally's direct Speed Force connection prevented Savitar from stealing Wally's speed, and a coalition of just about every speedster (except for Red Trinity) foiled his plans. Hell-bent on at least destroying the Flash's world in retribution, Savitar led Wally on a worldwide race of destruction, until the Flash chose to give Savitar what he wanted: union with the Speed Force. His earlier encounter had shown him that the others who had arrived before would deal with Savitar as they saw fit.

In The Flash Rebirth mini-series, Savitar was able to escape from the Speed Force. He was run down by the Flash (Barry Allen) but Savitar disintegrates when the Flash touches him, leaving only a pile of bones. It is revealed that Professor Zoom altered Barry's Speed Force connection to make the Flash shift in reverse, cursed to kill every Speed Force user with a single touch until a conflict between the Flash and Zoom. Savitar, Lady Savitar (Christina Alexandrova) and Johnny Quick have been killed by this effect.

In DC Rebirth, Troia (a version of Donna Troy from an alternate future) recalls that Wally was killed by either Savitar or Brother Blood from that time.

A retcon following Infinite Frontier establishes that Savitar, escaping his imprisonment at Barry's hands in the Speed Force, was responsible for the deaths at Sanctuary in Heroes in Crisis, not Wally as originally believed. The explosion was caused as the Speed Force attempted to eject Savitar at various points along the timeline, succeeding at Sanctuary. Battling Wally during a frozen moment in time, Wally brings him back to the present, leaving recorded history untouched, before defeating Savitar and adding his power to his own.

Powers and abilities
Savitar can move at super-speed, and is able to lend or steal speed from moving objects. He has accelerated healing due to increased metabolism and can generate a null Inertia force field.

In other media

A variation of Savitar (hybridized with the Future Flash from the Out of Time storyline) appears in the third season of The Flash, portrayed by Grant Gustin while Tobin Bell provides his disguised voice and Andre Tricoteux portrays his powered armor. This version is originally a time remnant of Barry Allen created to help defeat Savitar in the future. After Savitar is defeated and imprisoned in the Speed Force, the time remnant is shunned and driven to insanity, traveling back in time to create the myth of Savitar as well as escape his imprisonment by creating a "closed loop" in time.
 Savitar appears in DC Legends.

References

External links
 

Characters created by Mark Waid
Comics characters introduced in 1995
DC Comics martial artists
DC Comics metahumans
DC Comics supervillains
DC Comics characters who can move at superhuman speeds
DC Comics characters with accelerated healing
Fictional characters with dimensional travel abilities
Fictional characters who can manipulate time
Fictional characters with electric or magnetic abilities
Fictional characters with absorption or parasitic abilities
Fictional aviators
Fictional fighter pilots
Flash (comics) characters
Time travelers